Farleys Brook is the name of a minor watercourse in Hucknall, Nottinghamshire. It rises in a pool within Watnall Coppice close to the M1 motorway at the foot of the Misk Hills, coordinates 53.034471 N, 1.248907 W. It flows southeastwards through the Misk Meadows, passing very briefly into Broxtowe Borough, before returning to Ashfield District, then Pennine View, and Nabbs Lane Estates, where several parks and open spaces are centred on flood prevention lagoons. The Brook flows past the former Hucknall Aerodrome and into Farleys Lane Nature Area, following the A611 Hucknall Bypass. Farleys Lane Spring rises in the Brook close to this point and a deep pool is formed which is used for paddling and bathing. The Brook flows into the River Leen close to Moorbridge, Bulwell.

Developments
As part of a Department for Environment, Food and Rural Affairs (DEFRA) scheme for farm conservation, a permissive path has been established alongside the brook from Farleys Lane to the dismantled railway embankment further to the east. As well as providing access to the waterside grassland for visitors, the hedgerows have been improved, and the pond to the east of Farleys Lane has been cleared, to provide a better habitat for invertebrates and birds.

The lower reaches of the brook have been designated as a Site of Importance for Nature Conservation (SINC). However, the status of this section is under threat, due to proposals for a new industrial park and the construction of 900 new homes. Access roads for the development would cross the conservation site, and objections have been raised by the Nottinghamshire Wildlife Trust, particularly because of its effect on local populations of water voles and lizards which are protected species. The developers and council have approached the Environment Agency about the possibility of culverting the watercourse in the area.

Points of interest

References

Rivers of Nottinghamshire
2Farleys